Gurung (exonym) or Tamu (endonym;) is a common surname among people of the Gurung Tamu ethnic group in Bhutan, Nepal and India. At the time of the 2011 Nepal census, 522,641 people (2.0% of the population of Nepal) identified as Gurung. Gurung people predominantly live around the Annapurna Region in Manang, Mustang, Dolpo, Kaski, Lamjung, Gorkha, Parbat and Syangja districts of Nepal. They are one of the main Gurkha tribes.

Notable Gurung people

Notable individuals with the surname include:
 Amanda Manandhar Gurung, Winner of Miss Teen Nepal 2002
 Amar Bahadur Gurung, Indian association football player
 Amber Gurung (19382016), composer, singer and lyricist
 Amrit Gurung (active 1991after 2013), singer and musician, founder of the band Nepathaya
 Anamika Gurung, Winner of Miss Teen Nepal 2008
 Anil Gurung (born 1988), football player
 Anita Gurung, Miss Nepal 2004 2nd Runner Up
 Anju Gurung (born 1994), Bhutanese cricketer 
 Anupama Aura Gurung (born 1988), Miss Nepal Earth 2011
 Anuradha Koirala Gurung (born Gurung), founder and director of Maiti Nepal, 1st women governor of Province no. 3
 Bhanbhagta Gurung (19212008), Victoria Cross recipient, British Indian Army
 Bharat Gurung, had served as the Royal A.D.C. to Late Prince Dhirendra Shah of Nepal in the 1980s.
 Bhim Gurung (born 1981), Marathon Runner, sky runner, who won four races of the Skyrunning World Series international circuit.
 B. B. Gurung (born 1929–2022), third Chief Minister of Sikkim
 Bhison Gurung football player for Pokhara Thunders
 Bhumika Gurung actress
 Bimal Gurung, Indian Gorkha Politician and one of the founders and the president of the Gorkha Janmukti Morcha (GJM)
 Chaman Singh Gurung, member of the 1952 Helsinki Olympics hockey team that won the gold medal
 Chandra Gurung leader in conservation and sustainable field of Nepal.
 Chandra Bahadur Gurung (active 2008), politician
 Chandra Kumari Gurung, former Nepali migrant worker in South Korea
 Chitra Bahadur Gurung, former swimmer
 Chhatra Man Singh Gurung (born 1952), Nepali military officer and Chief of Staff of the Nepali Army
 Chhetan Gurung (1979–2020) Nepalese film director and writer known for his work in Nepali cinema.
 Ciney Gurung (active 2010), singer
 Darshan Gurung (born 2002), Nepalese former professional footballer who last played as a midfielder for New Road Team (NRT).
 Dev Gurung (before 1996after 2008), politician
 Dipak Gurung football player for Pokhara Thunders
 Dipendra Gurung (British Businessman, Millionaire and Owner of Miss World beauty pageant
 Dhanraj Gurung, Nepali politician belonging to Nepali Congress
 Gajendra Gurung, Indian politician
 Ghim Kumari Gurung, footballer who plays for the Nepal Army Club, and the Nepal women's national football
 Gopal Gurung (born 1939 – 2016), politician, author, journalist, teacher and vocal advocate of the human rights.
 Hari Gurung, Bhutanese footballer
 Harka Gurung, geologist, anthropologist, and author
 Hem Bahadur Gurung (active 19792009), former Inspector General of Police (IGP)
 Heman Gurung, international footballer who plays as a midfielder for Himalayan Sherpa Club
 Hemant Gurung, Bhutanese politician who has been a member of the National Assembly of Bhutan
 Hira Gurung, politician and a member of the House of Representatives of the federal parliament of Nepal
 Hit Kaji Gurung (active 1999after 2008), politician
 Israil Gurung, Indian professional footballer
 Jamuna Gurung, Australian businesswomen and Billionaire
 Jamuna Gurung, former captain of the Nepal women's national football team.
 Jassita Gurung, Nepali actress
 Jeewan Gurung, The Edge Band musical member
 Jodha Gurung (born 1954), middle-distance runner
 Karun Gurung, Bhutanese former international football and futsal player
 Kedar Gurung,  Indian educationist and writer of Nepalese literature, known for his satirical expressions
 Khem Raj Gurung, musician and singer
 Kiran Gurung (active 2008), politician
 Kishor Gurung, guitarist and ethnomusicologist
 Kul Bahadur Gurung (active 2008), politician
 Lachhiman Gurung (19172010), Victoria Cross recipient, British Indian Army
 Lal Kaji Gurung, politician and a member of the House of Representatives of the federal parliament of Nepal
 Mahadev Gurung (active 1999), politician
 Man Bahadur Gurung, politician
 Mausami Gurung,  singer and songwriter
 Malewa Devi Gurung, first female singer of Nepal
 Milan Gurung criminal
 Min Bahadur Gurung, owner of Bhat-Bhateni Supermarket
 Narsingh Gurung, Nepalese Kaji under King Rana Bahadur Shah
 Novin Gurung (born 1999), Indian professional footballer
 Nishma Gurung (born 1980), freestyle swimmer who represented Nepal in the 1996 Summer Olympic Games
 Om Gurung, (1953–2022) sociologist who was head of the Central Department of Sociology/Anthropology of the Tribhuvan University
 Omi Gurung, Indian fashion designer
 Palten Gurung (active 19942008), politician
 Parbat Gurung, politician and former Minister of Communication and Information Technology
 Parshuram Megi Gurung, communist politician and member of the National Assembly
 Prabal Gurung (born 1979), New York fashion designer
 Prabesh Gurung, Indian cricketer
 Prabhat Gurung (born 2004), Nepalese-born Hong Kong professional footballer who currently plays as a midfielder for Hong Kong
 Prakash Gurung, musician and singer
 Prakash Bahadur Gurung (active 1999), politician
 Praveen Gurung (born 1962 – 2000), folk music singer and music arranger
 Prithvi Man Gurung, Chief Minister of State 
 Prithvi Subba Gurung, Politician of Gandaki Province
 Puran Andrew Gurung, Indian Taekwondo practitioner and coach
 Rachana Gurung Sharma, choreographer of Miss Nepal
 Rajan Gurung (born 2000), football player
 Rajani Gurung actress
 Ram Babu Gurung, writer and director
 Ram Prasad Gurung, boxer
 Regan Gurung, American psychologist and award-winning author
 Renuka Gurung, politician and ex-State Minister of Women, Children and Senior Citizens
 Rishma Gurung, actress and model
 Robin Gurung (born 1992), Indian professional footballer
 Sanjay Gurung (born 1969), Nepalese cricket umpire
 Sarah Gurung, Miss Nepal 2004 1st Runner Up
 Sarita Gurung, philanthropist and social worker
 Shesh Ghale, Australian Businessman and Billionaire 
 Sipora Gurung, volleyball player
 Sita Gurung, politician, belonging to the Nepali Congress currently serving as the member of the 2nd Federal Parliament of Nepal
 Sirish Gurung, competitive swimmer
 Sukmit Gurung, modern classical singer
 Suraj Gurung football player for Pokhara Thunders
 Surya Man Gurung (active 19992008), politician
 Suvash Gurung (born 1991), Nepalese professional footballer who plays as a midfielder for Martyr's Memorial
 T. S. Gurung (192389), social and political worker
 Tek Bahadur Gurung, member of Nepali Congress, assumed the post of the Minister for Labour and Employment of Nepal
 Tim Gurung, writer
 Thaman Gurung (192444), Victoria Cross recipient, British Indian Army
 Toya Gurung, writer and poet
 Trishna Gurung, (born 1985) Nepali singer and also a coach of The Voice of Nepal Season 3, a reality show.

References

Nepali-language surnames
Nepali language
 
Demographics of Nepal
Ethnic groups in Nepal
Ethnic groups in South Asia
Linguistic groups of the constitutionally recognised official languages of India
Indian surnames
Surnames of Bhutanese origin